Charles Frank Black (November 23, 1949 – April 23, 2021) was an American country music songwriter and record producer.

Biography
Black graduated from University of Maryland in 1970 and moved to Nashville, Tennessee the same year. His first cut was "Girl, You Came and Eased My Mind" by Tommy Overstreet. Since then, he wrote singles for Anne Murray, Gary Morris, Earl Thomas Conley, Johnny Paycheck, and Phil Vassar. In 1991, the Nashville Songwriters Association International inducted Black into its hall of fame.

Black was also an occasional record producer. He produced early recordings by Cristy Lane, including her 1978 studio albums Cristy Lane Is the Name and Love Lies.

Black was married to Dana Hunt, who is also a songwriter. She co-wrote George Strait's singles "Check Yes or No" and "Write This Down".

Black died on April 23, 2021.

References

External links
 

1949 births
2021 deaths
American country singer-songwriters
American record producers
People from Cheverly, Maryland
Singer-songwriters from Maryland
Country musicians from Maryland
American male singer-songwriters